Evangelical Christian School (ECS) is a private, college preparatory, non-denominational Christian school in Fort Myers, Florida.

History
ECS was founded in May 1973 by Douglas D. and Elsie M. Dunn. In 1975 the school was moved to its present site. Over the years, the enrollment has grown to exceed 1,000 students and several new buildings have been added.

Notable alumni
 Matt Caldwell, former Republican member of the Florida House of Representatives, representing District 79 from 2010 to 2018.
 Corey Lynch, NFL player

Notable faculty
Earnest Graham was hired in February 2019 as head football coach.

References

External links
Evangelical Christian School

Christian schools in Florida
Educational institutions established in 1973
Nondenominational Christian schools in the United States
Preparatory schools in Florida
Private high schools in Florida
Private middle schools in Florida
Private elementary schools in Florida
High schools in Lee County, Florida
1973 establishments in Florida